Anserma may refer to:

Anserma, Caldas, a town and municipality in Colombia
Anserma language, an extinct Chocoan language of Colombia